1955 is a 1998 hip hop music album by Soul-Junk. Musically, the album is the most centred between the low-fi and hip hop eras of Soul-Junk; as put by CCM Magazine "trip-hop meets folk meets retro rock." As with many Soul-Junk albums, the Biblical references from which the lyrics are drawn are listed in the liner. 1955 has a length of about two-and-a-half hours, which was cut from about six hours of material.

Track listing

Personnel
Glen Galaxy - Guitar, vocals, inside cover artwork
Jon Galaxy  - Bass, Science
Ron Easterbrooks  - Guitar, vocals
Nathan Poage  - Drums
Chuck P. - knobs
Mia Af The Lion - vocals
Rachel Smith - vocals

References

1998 albums
Soul-Junk albums